With an elevation of  and a topographic prominence of , Fóia is the highest mountain of Algarve, Portugal. It is part of the Serra de Monchique range and is located at  within Monchique parish.

There is a paved road right to the summit which is topped by several telecommunication facilities including the Radar Station Number 1 of the Portuguese Air Force. On a clear day the Atlantic Ocean is visible.

Mountains of Portugal